Sibongile Sambo (born 1974 in Bushbuckridge) is a South African airline executive. She founded SRS Aviation. Sambo was named on the "20 Young Power Women in Africa 2013" list.

Life
She graduated from University of Zululand.

Sambo was not able to become a flight attendant with South African Airways.
In 2004, she won a South African government contract. She founded SRS Aviation, which offers jet and helicopter rental services, air cargo charter, tourist transfers, general air security, medical evacuation and other aero services. SRS Aviation is the first black female owned aviation company in South Africa.

In February 2020, Sambo testified before the Zondo Commission of Inquiry into state capture in Parktown, Johannesburg, as part of its investigation into South African Airways management.

References

External links

CNN

1974 births
Living people
South African business executives
South African women business executives
South African women company founders
Women chief executives
South African chief executives
21st-century South African businesswomen
21st-century South African businesspeople
South African corporate directors
University of Zululand alumni